Brazell is a surname. Notable people with the surname include:

 Bennie Brazell (born 1982), American footballer
 Craig Brazell (born 1980), American baseball player
 Karen Brazell, American professor and translator
 Rashawn Brazell, American murder victim

See also
 Brazel